The Ice King is a novel by Michael Scott Rohan and Allan Scott published in 1983.

Plot summary
The Ice King is a novel in which archaeologists dig up an ancient evil.

Reception
Dave Langford reviewed The Ice King for White Dwarf #78, and stated that "the appalling Ice King is not (in the last analysis) wholly unsympathetic. Good rousing stuff".

Reviews
Review by Chris Morgan (1986) in Fantasy Review, March 1986
Review by Barbara Davies (1986) in Vector 132
Review by Ken Brown (1987) in Interzone, #21 Autumn 1987

References

1983 novels